Cabo Gracias a Dios is a cape located in the middle of the east coast of Central America, within what is variously called the Mosquito Coast and La Mosquitia. It is the point where the Rio Coco flows into the Caribbean, and is the  border between the Nicaraguan North Caribbean Coast Autonomous Region and the Honduran department also known as Gracias a Dios.

The point was designated as the official Honduras–Nicaragua border by an award of King Alfonso XIII of Spain in 1906, and confirmed by the International Court of Justice in 1960. The exact terminal point was determined to be at 14°59.8'N 83°08.9'W.

The name is Spanish for "Cape Thank God" and is said to have been bestowed by Christopher Columbus on his last voyage in 1502 when the weather calmed suddenly as he rounded the cape during a severe storm.  This incident also gave the name to Honduras, which means 'depths' in Spanish, since the complete phrase is said to have been 'Gracias a Dios hemos salido de esas Honduras', or 'Thank God we have come out from those depths', and both places were automatically named at that very moment.

Geography

Climate

References

Landforms of Nicaragua
Landforms of Honduras
Gracias a Dios
Honduras–Nicaragua border crossings